Orlock Bridge Fault is a major geological fault which extends through County Armagh, Northern Ireland and across the North Channel into Galloway in southern Scotland.

See also
 List of geological faults in Northern Ireland

References

 Map sheet 44 (and accompanying memoir) of the series of 1:50,000 scale geological maps of Northern Ireland published by Geological Survey of Northern Ireland. 
 Lyle, P. 2003 Classic geology in Europe 5 The north of Ireland Terra Publishing, Harpenden

Geography of County Armagh
Seismic faults of Northern Ireland
Geology of Scotland